The 1934 Marquette Golden Avalanche football team was an American football team that represented Marquette University as an independent during the 1934 college football season. In its 13th season under head coach Frank Murray, the team compiled a 4–5 record and outscored opponents by a total of 129 to 104. The team played its home games at Marquette Stadium in Milwaukee.

Frank Murray was Marquette's head football coach for 19 years and was posthumously inducted into the College Football Hall of Fame in 1983.

Schedule

References

Marquette
Marquette Golden Avalanche football seasons
Marquette Golden Avalanche football